Veronica lyallii is a species of flowering plant in the family Plantaginaceae, native to New Zealand. Under its synonym Parahebe lyallii, its cultivar 'Julie-Anne' has gained the Royal Horticultural Society's Award of Garden Merit.

References

lyallii
Endemic flora of New Zealand
Flora of the North Island
Flora of the South Island
Plants described in 1853